A carriage clock is a small, spring-driven clock, designed for travelling, developed in the early 19th century in France, where they were also known as "Officers' Clocks". The first carriage clock was invented by Abraham-Louis Breguet for the Emperor Napoleon in 1812. The case, usually plain or gilt-brass, is rectangular with a carrying handle and often set with glass or more rarely enamel or porcelain panels. A feature of carriage clocks is the platform escapement, sometimes visible through a glazed aperture on the top of the case. Carriage clocks use a balance and balance spring for timekeeping and replaced the larger pendulum bracket clock. 
The factory of Armand Couaillet, in Saint-Nicolas d'Aliermont, France, made thousands of carriage clocks between 1880 and 1920. 

A carriage clock has in the past been a traditional gift from employers to retiring or long-serving staff. However, in modern times, with changing work patterns and changing desires, this is much less the case.

Sources and references
Charles Allix and Peter Bonnert, Carriage Clocks. Their history and development, Antique Collector's club, 1974
Emmanuelle Cournarie, La mécanique du geste, trois siècles d'histoire horlogère à Saint-Nicolas d'Aliermont, Édition PTC-Les Falaises, 2011 (French)
Lolita Delesque and Marianne Lombardi, Armand Couaillet, horloger et inventeur de génie, Musée de l'horlogerie, juin 2013, 44p (French)

External links 

Antiques
Clock designs